Petros Mantalos (born 31 August 1991) is a Greek professional footballer who plays as an attacking midfielder for Super League club AEK Athens and the Greece national team.

Club career

Skoda Xanthi
Petros Mantalos began playing professional football for Superleague club Skoda Xanthi. He played a total of 90 games (15 goals, 10 assists) in all competitions and represented his country at under-19 and under-21 levels. His performances attracted the interest of Greek giants Olympiacos, Panathinaikos and AEK Athens, the latter club newly relegated from the Superleague, bankrupt, and making a fresh start in the third-tier Football League 2. In July 2013, Mantalos agreed to join AEK from the 2014–15 season. The fee was reported as around €500,000. He remained with Xanthi for the 2013–14 season, making 30 Superleague appearances as well as playing in the UEFA Europa League.

AEK Athens
By the time Mantalos joined up with AEK, they had been promoted to the second-tier Football League. He made his debut on 12 September in the first round of the Greek Cup, and his first league appearance on 19 October 2014 at home to Apollon Smyrnis: with his team losing 1–0, Mantalos took the free kick from which Alexandre D'Acol equalised and then converted a penalty to complete a 2–1 win. He went on to score 11 goals and provide 15 assists in 22 games in League and Cup combined. Mantalos himself missed the last few weeks of the season, having ruptured his anterior cruciate ligament while playing in a cup derby against Olympiacos in March 2015. He said afterwards that it was his first major injury, he was not going to rush his recovery, and that AEK could manage well enough without him. This they proved, finishing top of the South Group and then winning the play-offs.

After six months out, Mantalos returned to competitive action and continued as a regular in the first team, helping AEK finish third in the 2015–16 Superleague and qualify for the Europa League. He scored the only goal of the first leg of the Greek Cup semifinal against Atromitos, and captained the side in the final at the Olympic Stadium. His first-half headed goal contributed to AEK's 2–1 defeat of champions Olympiacos to win the competition for the 15th time, and he was named MVP of the match.

According to an end-of-season profile, Mantalos "endured a difficult start to the campaign", which was interrupted by the need for surgery on a nose broken in training, "but seemed rejuvenated once Manolo Jiménez took over the team" in January 2017.<ref name="AgonaSport1617">{{cite news |url=https://www.agonasport.com/agonasport-allnews/agonasports-starting-xi-for-the-2016/17-superleague-season |title=''AGONAsports Starting XI for the 2016/17 SuperLeague Season |first=Sarantos |last=Kaperonis |website=AGONAsport |date=9 May 2017 |access-date=26 November 2019}}</ref> He finished the season with a goal and an assist in a 2–1 win against Panionios in the play-offs that confirmed AEK's place in the UEFA Champions League third qualifying round, and was voted best Greek footballer in the Superleague at the PSAP awards. In light of interest from Spanish clubs, AEK were reported to be unwilling to sell at less than €5 or €6 million, as the player still had two years left on his contract.

AEK went top of the Superleague three weeks into the 2017–18 season after a 4–0 win over Larissa, in which Mantalos opened the scoring with a fourth-minute bicycle kick. Although AEK failed to progress in the Champions League, they qualified for the Europa League group stage; in their first match, Mantalos scored as AEK beat Rijeka 2–1. A few days later, he scored an 89th-minute winner as they came back from 2–0 down after 63 minutes to beat reigning champions Olympiacos 3–2. At the end of October, Mantalos suffered another ruptured ACL, this time in his left knee. As a gesture of support, the club offered Mantalos a contract extension until 2022, which he accepted. He returned to action as a substitute on 21 April as AEK beat Levadiakos to clinch their first Superleague title since 1994.

Mantalos converted a penalty in a 1–1 draw in the Champions League play-off round second leg against Vidi that, despite having two men sent off, was enough to progress to the group stage on aggregate. Two days after reports emerged that the club had rejected a bid valued at €10 million for Mantalos from English Championship club West Bromwich Albion, he scored his first goal of the 2018–19 Superleague season, a penalty, that gave AEK a 1–0 win away to Asteras Tripolis. His fourth league goal, which opened the scoring in a 2–0 win away to Panionios in January 2019, was controversial as he appeared to handle the ball when controlling the final pass. Mantalos scored twice against Atromitos in the quarter-final of that season's Greek Cup as AEK went on to reach and lose to PAOK in the final for the third year running.

Mantalos scored in both legs of AEK's 2019–20 Europa League qualifier against Universitatea Craiova, but despite his goal in the play-off round against Trabzonspor, the tie ended 3–3 on aggregate and AEK were eliminated on away goals. On 20 October 2019, he scored a brace sealing a vital 3–2 home win game against Volos. It was elected MVP of the game. On 7 December 2019, he scored with an excellent kick in a hammering 5–0 home win game against Panionios. On 18 December 2019, Mantalos opened the scoring from the penalty spot after six minutes to put Massimo Carrera’s AEK in front in a 2–1 home win game against Asteras Tripolis. On 23 February 2020, Mantalos scored with a diagonal header into the corner, after five minutes from a Marko Livaja's cross, in a 3–0 home win game against OFI. On 4 March 2020, Marko Livaja picked out the onrushing Mantalos on the left, and the latter calmly stroked the ball into the far corner beyond Julián Cuesta, opening the score in a slender 2–1 advantage against Aris in Athens, with the second leg of the Greek Cup semi-final to be played at the Kleanthis Vikelidis Stadium next month. At the end of the regular season, Mantalos has showed a consistency throughout the entire campaign and as a result clubs from Turkey, including Super Lig leaders İstanbul Başakşehir, are reportedly eager to sign the 28-year-old in the upcoming transfer window.

At mid August 2020, UAE Pro League club Al-Nasr offer an amount of €4.3 million for the Greek international. According to information, AEK are considering the proposal from Al-Nasr, with negotiations continuing between the two organisations. Mantalos would reportedly earn in the region of €1 million per year with Al-Nasr, but the transfer is not completed.

On 19 September 2020, in the 2020–21 Super League Greece opener, Mantalos scored as a substitute sealing a 2–0 away win against Panetolikos. On 5 November 2020, he scored in a 4–1 away win 2020–21 UEFA Europa League group stage game against Zorya Luhansk helping AEK to increase the possibility of qualifying for the next phase of the UEFA Europa League. On 22 November 2020, Mantalos made an impressive performance, giving 3 assists and receiving the Man of the Match award in a 4–1 home win against AEL. On 19 March 2021, Mantalos renew his contract with the club until the summer of 2024. On 9 May 2021, he scored a vital goal sealing a 1–0 away victory against rivals Panathinaikos in his club effort to gain the last ticket for 2021–22 UEFA Europa Conference League.

On 30 July 2021, Mantalos scored with a penalty kick at the last moment of the UEFA Europa Conference League game, but AEK faced a frustrated defeat with 3–2 on penalties against FK Velež Mostar, with Sergio Araujo losing the decisive penalty for the club. In the three last season, starting from 2019-20 season has more than 10 assists per year. 

International career
As a "second division" player Mantalos' international call in Greece national football team was a big surprise by Claudio Ranieri. On September 7, 2014 Mantalos made his international debut in a match against Romania for the European Qualifiers 2016.

Mantalos scored his first international goal on 7 June 2016 in Melbourne Australia, against Australia in an eventual 2–1 win.

On 7 October 2016, he scored the second goal sealing a 2–0 home win against Cyprus for UEFA World Cup 2018 preliminary round.

Career statistics
Club

International

As of match played 11 October 2020. Greece score listed first, score column indicates score after each Mantalos goal.

Honours
ClubAEK Athens'''
Super League Greece: 2017–18
Greek Cup: 2015–16, ; runner-up: 2016–17, 2017–18,  2018–19, 2019–20
Football League Greece: 2014–15 (South Group)

Individual
Super League Greece Greek Footballer of the Year: 2016–17
Super League Greece Team of the Year: 2016–17
Super League Greece Top assist provider: 2021–22

References

External links

Super League profile

1991 births
Living people
Greek footballers
Xanthi F.C. players
AEK Athens F.C. players
Super League Greece players
Footballers from Komotini
Greece youth international footballers
Greece under-21 international footballers
Greece international footballers
Association football midfielders